"Always Strapped" is the first single from rapper Birdman's fourth studio album, Priceless. It was released officially on iTunes on March 17, 2009. The song features Lil Wayne and Mack Maine and was produced by Mr. Beatz. The song is a rework of a 2006 leak of the same name.

Background
In 2006, a version of this song leaked online with Lil Wayne and Juelz Santana. It is believed this version was intended for their shelved collaborative album, "I Can't Feel My Face". Then, in November 2006, another version leaked online on a bootleg mixtape by DJ Joey Fingaz, believed to be a leftover from Like Father, Like Son. Lil Wayne used the same first verse as the previous version, although re-recorded and Juelz Santana was replaced with Birdman. The final version released 3 years later, in 2009, featured the same vocals from the leaked version with Birdman and Lil Wayne, but with a new instrumental. Mack Maine was later added to the song also.

Music video
There are two videos for the song, first the original version of the song and the remix version of the song.

The first video was premiered on MTV Jams, Sucker Free Sunday, and MTV.com on June 14, 2009 and was the video for the original version of the song. Birdman and Lil Wayne raps their verses from the original version of the song. However, Mack Maine is featured in the video and raps his own new verse. 
This version ranked at #18 on BET's Notarized: Top 100 Videos of 2009 countdown.

The second video was the remix premiered on BET's 106 & Park on June 15, 2009. The remix video featured Young Jeezy and Rick Ross, who also filmed his part on the video. DJ Khaled, Lil' Twist, Rick Ross, 2 Pistols, Yo Gotti, All Star Cashville Prince, and Kevin Rudolf make appearances in the video. Birdman, Lil' Wayne, Young Jeezy and Rick Ross rap their verses from the remix version of the song.

Remixes and versions
Original "I Can't Feel My Face" Version: Lil Wayne (featuring Juelz Santana)
Original "Like Father, Like Son" Version: Lil Wayne & Birdman
Album and video Version (credited as "Always Strapped (Remix)": Birdman (featuring Lil Wayne & Mack Maine)
Single version: Birdman (featuring Lil Wayne)
Official remix version: Birdman (featuring DJ Khaled, Lil Wayne, Young Jeezy & Rick Ross)

Charts

Weekly charts

Year-end charts

Certifications

References 

2009 singles
Birdman (rapper) songs
Lil Wayne songs
Mack Maine songs
Cash Money Records singles
Gangsta rap songs
Songs written by Lil Wayne
2009 songs